The Tocantins gubernatorial election was held on October 3, 2010, to elect the next governor of Tocantins. Incumbent Governor Carlos Gaguim was running for his first full term, but lost narrowly to the PSDB's Siqueira Campos.

Candidates

Election results

References 

2010 Brazilian gubernatorial elections
Tocantins gubernatorial elections
October 2010 events in South America